Giorgos Giamalis (6 August 1907 – 24 February 1985) was a Greek footballer who played as a goalkeeper. He was nicknamed "Valentino", after Rudolph Valentino, as he was a great charmer of women at the time.

Club career
Giamalis started his career at Hefestos Constantinople in 1922. He was also playing in the team of the Robertian school where he studied from 1922 to 1925. Until 1924, he played as a midfielder when by a random event he played goalkeeper and established himself in this position. At the Robertio school he also participated in the 400-meter track team.

In 1926 he traveled to Greece and joined the newly-formed AEK Athens. He became the first great goalkeeper in the history of the club. He was known for his morals, as in 1927, in a match between AEK and Olympiacos, Georgios Andrianopoulos scored a goal, but the ball had gone through a hole in the nets, without anyone noticing except Giamalis who ran to the referee and asked him to count the goal, as he had seen the ball going through the net. Immediately Andrianopoulos, who was also captain of Olympiacos, asked the referee to stop the match and called his teammates to the center of the pitch, to congratulate him and applaud Giamalis. In April 1930 in a derby against Panathinaikos he scored a goal as he was frustrated of his team losing by 2–1 and the fruitless efforts his teammates to equalize, he took a powerful goal kick that the ball jumped two times in the opponent area and the opposition goalkeeper Argyrakis, in his effort to reach it, he pushed the ball into his net. He was the main goalkeeper of the club and in 1931 he won the first Greek Cup, that was also the first title of the club, defeating Aris with a score of 5–3. He quit football in 1932 tired of the footballer's life, at the age of only 25.

International career
Giamalis was the first goalkeeper that played for Greece, appearing 10 times, 4 of which as its captain between 1929 and 1932. His debut on 7 April 1929, in the first historical match of Greece against Italy B, at the Leoforos Alexandras Stadium.

After football
After the end of his career as a footballer, Giamalis was involved in track and field at a professional level and worked at PPC, even claiming positions at high ranks.

Personal life
Giamalis was married and had two daughters, Lina and Sofia. He died on 24 February 1985 from acute myocardial infarction. His funeral took place two days later at the cemetery of Palaio Faliro.

Honours

AEK Athens
Greek Cup: 1931–32

References

1907 births
1985 deaths
Greek footballers
Greece international footballers
Association football goalkeepers
AEK Athens F.C. players
Constantinopolitan Greeks
Turkish expatriate football managers
Footballers from Istanbul
Turkish people of Greek descent